The shovel hat was a style of hat formerly associated with the Anglican clergy, particularly archdeacons and bishops.

The hat was usually made of black beaver or felt, and had a low, round crown and a wide brim, which projected in a shovel-like curve at the front and rear and was often worn turned up at the sides. Like the tricorne it was a development of the low-crowned broad-brimmed hats fashionable in the later 17th century. 

Along with the bishop's apron and gaiters, the shovel hat was an instantly recognisable accoutrement of senior Anglican clergy between the 18th and late 19th century, although it was also worn by parsons and less senior figures. By the mid 19th century it was already seen as somewhat traditionalist or old-fashioned: Carlyle coined the term "shovelhattery" to attack hidebound orthodoxy in the Church of England. The term "broad-brimmed", occasionally used to describe Anglican churchmen in the 19th century (particularly the Evangelical party) was also derived from the shovel hat.

In the 1849 novel Shirley by Charlotte Brontë, chapters 1 and 17, the clergyman Mr Helstone is described as wearing a "Rehoboam, or shovel hat".

References

Hats
Anglican vestments
Religious headgear